1994–95 Pirveli Liga was the 6th season of the Georgian Pirveli Liga. The Pirveli Liga is the second division of Georgian Football. It consists of reserve team and professional team.

Eastern zone

Name changes:
Armazi Tbilisi changed name to Gvardia Tbilisi
Imedi Rustavi changed name to Azoti Rustavi
Avaza Tbilisi merged with Kruanisi Tbilisi
Antsi Tbilisi merged with Zooveti Tbilisi

Western zone

Name changes:
Anako Ozurgeti changed name back to Mertskhali Ozurgeti
Ulumbo Sapkhino changed name to Sagino Sapkhino
Universiteti Zugdidi merged with SKA (Zugdidi ?)

See also
1994–95 Umaglesi Liga
1994–95 Georgian Cup

Erovnuli Liga 2 seasons
2
Georgia